Radecznica  is a village in Zamość County, Lublin Voivodeship, in eastern Poland. It is the seat of the gmina (administrative district) called Gmina Radecznica.

The village has an approximate population of 920.

Shrine
Radecznica is a site of the famous shrine of saint Anthony of Padua. In 1664 he appeared here and ordered to build a church. Several miracles occurred soon. Then a monastery of the Order of Friars Minor was established. Since then Radecznica has been a popular pilgrimage site, up to this day, being dubbed a Częstochowa of Lublin Land. In 2015 Pope Francis proclaimed it a minor basilica.

References

Villages in Zamość County
Kholm Governorate
Catholic pilgrimage sites